Eero Lehmann (born 17 May 1974) is a German fencer. He competed in the individual sabre event at the 2000 Summer Olympics.

References

External links
 

1974 births
Living people
German male fencers
Olympic fencers of Germany
Fencers at the 2000 Summer Olympics
Sportspeople from Düsseldorf